Bifrenaria calcarata is a species of orchid.

calcarata